MFT may refer to:

Computers
 Managed file transfer, a technology that supports secure transfer of files within and among organizations
 Quarterdeck Manifest, a DOS system diagnostics tool by Quarterdeck Office Systems
 Master File Table, an integral component of the NTFS file system
 Media Foundation Transform, a media processing plugin filter model in Microsoft Media Foundation
 Multiprogramming with a Fixed number of Tasks, an option of the OS/360 operating system

Other
 Micro Four Thirds system, a lens mount for mirrorless interchangeable-lens digital cameras.
 Manchester University NHS Foundation Trust
 Marriage and Family Therapist
 Mean-field theory
 Moral foundations theory

See also
 
 
 MTF (disambiguation)